In linear algebra, a circulant matrix is a square matrix in which all row vectors are composed of the same elements and each row vector is rotated one element to the right relative to the preceding row vector. It is a particular kind of Toeplitz matrix.

In numerical analysis, circulant matrices are important because they are diagonalized by a discrete Fourier transform, and hence linear equations that contain them may be quickly solved using a fast Fourier transform.  They can be interpreted analytically as the integral kernel of a convolution operator on the cyclic group  and hence frequently appear in formal descriptions of spatially invariant linear operations. This property is also critical in modern software defined radios, which utilize Orthogonal Frequency Division Multiplexing to spread the symbols (bits) using a cyclic prefix. This enables the channel to be represented by a circulant matrix, simplifying channel equalization in the frequency domain.

In cryptography, a circulant matrix is used in the MixColumns step of the Advanced Encryption Standard.

Definition

An  circulant matrix  takes the form

or the transpose of this form (by choice of notation). When the term  is a  square matrix, then the  matrix  is called a block-circulant matrix.

(Cyclic permutation of rows has the same effect as cyclic permutation of columns.)

Different sources define the circulant matrix in different ways, for example as above, or with the vector  corresponding to the first row rather than the first column of the matrix; and possibly with a different direction of shift (which is sometimes called an anti-circulant matrix).

The polynomial  is called the associated polynomial of matrix .

Properties

Eigenvectors and eigenvalues 

The normalized eigenvectors of a circulant matrix are the Fourier modes, namely,

(This can be understood by realizing that multiplication with a circulant matrix implements a convolution. In Fourier space, convolutions become multiplication. Hence the product of a circulant matrix with a Fourier mode yields a multiple of that Fourier mode, i.e. it is an eigenvector.)

The corresponding eigenvalues are given by

Determinant 

As a consequence of the explicit formula for the eigenvalues above, 
the determinant of a circulant matrix can be computed as:

Since taking the transpose does not change the eigenvalues of a matrix, an equivalent formulation is

Rank 

Other properties 

 Any circulant is a matrix polynomial (namely, the associated polynomial) in the cyclic permutation matrix :  where  is given by 
 The set of  circulant matrices forms an -dimensional vector space with respect to addition and scalar multiplication.
 For a nonsingular circulant matrix , its inverse  is also circulant. For a singular circulant matrix, its Moore–Penrose pseudoinverse  is circulant.
 The matrix  that is composed of the eigenvectors of a circulant matrix is related to the discrete Fourier transform and its inverse transform:  Consequently the matrix  diagonalizes . This product can be readily calculated by a fast Fourier transform. Conversely, for any diagonal matrix , the product  is circulant.
Then the polynomial  is the characteristic polynomial of the following  submatrix of :  (see  for the proof).

Analytic interpretation
Circulant matrices can be interpreted geometrically, which explains the connection with the discrete Fourier transform.

Then, from the perspective of operator theory, a circulant matrix is the kernel of a discrete integral transform, namely the convolution operator for the function ; this is a discrete circular convolution. The formula for the convolution of the functions  is
 (recall that the sequences are periodic)

The discrete Fourier transform then converts convolution into multiplication, which in the matrix setting corresponds to diagonalization.

Symmetric circulant matrices
For a symmetric circulant matrix  one has the extra condition that . 
Thus it is determined by  elements. 

The eigenvalues of any real symmetric matrix are real.
The corresponding eigenvalues become:

for  even, and

This can be further simplified by using the fact that .

Symmetric circulant matrices belong to the class  of bisymmetric matrices.

Hermitian circulant matrices
The complex version of the circulant matrix, ubiquitous in communications theory, is usually Hermitian.  In this case  and its determinant and all eigenvalues are real.

If n is even the first two rows necessarily takes the form

in which the first element  in the top second half-row is real.

If n is odd we get

Tee has discussed constraints on the eigenvalues for the Hermitian condition.

Applications

In linear equations

Given a matrix equation

where  is a circulant square matrix of size  we can write the equation as the circular convolution

Using the circular convolution theorem, we can use the discrete Fourier transform to transform the cyclic convolution into component-wise multiplication

so that

This algorithm is much faster than the standard Gaussian elimination, especially if a fast Fourier transform is used.

In graph theory 

In graph theory, a graph or digraph whose adjacency matrix is circulant is called a circulant graph (or digraph).  Equivalently, a graph is circulant if its automorphism group contains a full-length cycle. The Möbius ladders are examples of circulant graphs, as are the Paley graphs for fields of prime order.

References

External links
 R. M. Gray, Toeplitz and Circulant Matrices: A Review 
 
 IPython Notebook demonstrating properties of circulant matrices

Numerical linear algebra
Matrices
Latin squares
Determinants